The Cacique Nutivara Bloc (in Spanish, Bloque Cacique Nutibara, or BCN) was a Colombian paramilitary bloc founded by Diego Murillo Bejarano, affiliated with the United Self-Defense Forces of Colombia (AUC) paramilitary umbrella group.

The BCN officially demobilized on November 25, 2003, at which point it had 874 members.  

Members of this bloc have been accused of participating in a later massacre which occurred on January 29, 2005, in the municipality of San Carlos, Antioquia, in which seven people, including two children, were killed.

References 

Paramilitary organisations based in Colombia
Blocs of the United Self-Defense Forces of Colombia

In an article in the Colombian newspaper ADN on December 1, 2013, journalist Ortiz Juan Diego Jimenez writes that the origins of the Dawn (Alborada) celebration in Medellin when fireworks are set off on the last day of November in anticipation of December, can be traced to November 25, 2003 when 849 members of the Cacique Nutivara Bloc  demobilized.  The writer claims the motive for the pyrotechnics was to celebrate the group's return to civil life.  The 'tradition' has taken hold and is celebrated to this day.